Large Animal Games was an independent casual game developer, known for their game Color Zen. The company was founded in New York City, New York during 2001 by Wade Tinney and Josh Welber, and Large Animal Games released over 100 games for a variety of platforms until they announced that they were closing in March 2014.

Mobile Games
 Color Zen
 Color Zen Kids
Character Cards
PhotoBlitz
Nomsters
Bananagrams iPhone
Bumperstars iPhone
Fashion Solitaire
Lucky Cruise Slots
Universal Film Mogul
Picturiffic
Spartacus: Gods of the Arena
Spartacus: Vengeance
Office World
Bananagram
Bumper Stars
Lucky Strike Lanes

References

External links 
 

Video game development companies
Video game companies established in 2001
Video game companies disestablished in 2014
Defunct video game companies of the United States
Casual games